is a passenger railway station  located in the city of Sakaiminato, Tottori Prefecture, Japan. It is operated by the West Japan Railway Company (JR West).

Lines

Station layout
The station consists of two opposed ground-level side platforms connected by a level crossing. There is no station building, and station is unattended.

Platforms

Adjacent stations

History
Nakahama Station opened on July 1, 1952.

Passenger statistics
In fiscal 2018, the station was used by an average of 102 passengers daily.

Surrounding area
Miho-Yonago Airport - about 900 meters, 15 minutes on foot.
Sakaiminato Municipal Nakahama Elementary School

See also
List of railway stations in Japan

References

External links 

  Nakahama Station from JR-Odekake.net 

Railway stations in Japan opened in 1952
Railway stations in Tottori Prefecture
Stations of West Japan Railway Company
Sakaiminato, Tottori